Kurumdy Mountain is a mountain in the Pamir Mountains of Central Asia, in the eastern section of the Trans-Alay Range.

Location 

Kurumdy is located in the eastern part of the Trans-Alay Range in the Pamir Mountains of Central Asia. It is 22 km east of the Kyzyl-Art Pass. On the northern side flows the East Kyzilsy Glacier with a length of 3,7 km and an area of 69,4 km2.

Since territorial changes in 2011 it is the three state summit between Kyrgyzstan and Tajikistan and China.

Climbing history

There is some uncertainty concerning the first ascent. An ascent by E. Timashev and party from the south apparently reached the main summit in 1932. However, other sources surmise this party only made it to Kurumdu West (6154 m).

On October 1, 2001, Michael Mihajlov and Vitaliy Akimov reached the Kurumdy I summit by climbing a major north ridge. This would be the first ascent if the 1932 ascent was only to Kurumdu West.

The first traverse (East-West, 15 days) was accomplished in summer 2015 by the Austrians Markus Gschwendt and Katharina Pfnaisl. This was the second ascent of the main summit (6614 m, 5 August 2015). Further they traversed some 6000 m peaks of which at least two peaks were unclimbed at this time. For the ascent they used a very steep slope east oft the Kurumdy east summits (6384 m, Peak Kathi 6259 m). The descent was done by crossing the west summits (6554 m, 6283 m) and then following a north ridge to Golova Orla 5440 m from where they reached the Basecamp (3770 m)

Information for visitors 

For the Area is a border-area-permit necessary (info from 2015)

Approach from the north, Kyrgyzstan: Airport in Osh, Taxi to Sari Tash, with Horses to the basecamp on the northern side of the East Kyzilsy Glacier at 3770 m. Water quality can be a problem. Bring a water filter system.

There is no easy line to the summit. Success depends much on snow conditions and weather.

See also
 List of Ultras of Central Asia
 Kurumdy @ summitpost.org

References

Mountains of Kyrgyzstan
Mountains of Tajikistan
International mountains of Asia
Kyrgyzstan–Tajikistan border
Six-thousanders of the Pamir